Zoran Hočevar (born 21 December 1944) is a Slovene writer, playwright and painter.

He won the Kresnik Award for his novel Šolen z Brega in 1998.

Novels
 Porkasvet (1995)
 Šolen z Brega (1997)
 Za znoret (1999) 
 Rožen cvet (2004) 
 Ernijeva kuhna (2010)

Plays
 Smeči (1995) 
 Mož za Zofijo (1998) 
 M' te ubu (2001)

References

1944 births
Living people
People from Metlika
Slovenian writers
Slovenian dramatists and playwrights
Kresnik Award laureates